Gema Simon (born 19 July 1990) is an Australian international soccer player who plays for Newcastle Jets and the Australia women's national soccer team.

Early life
Simon was born in Armidale, New South Wales. She is an Indigenous Australian, and grew up the eldest of three siblings. Her cousin, Kyah Simon, is also an Australian international footballer. Gema started playing football aged five.

Playing career

Club
Simon was a member of the inaugural Newcastle Jets team in the W-League in 2008–09.

In May 2013, Simon joined USL W-League side Ottawa Fury. She was not paid for her time at the club, but did receive off-field assistance. She suffered an injury one month into the season and did not recover during her remaining two months with the side.

In 2013, Simon was given the captaincy of the Jets. She was awarded the Jets' Player of the Year award for the 2013–14 season

After captaining Newcastle Jets in the 2013–14 season, Simon joined Melbourne Victory alongside Hannah Brewer.

In October 2015, Simon re-joined the Newcastle Jets.

After a rewarding season with Newcastle Jets, Simon signed a deal to play the winter season with Suwon in the WK League.

After her loan at Suwon, Simon was announced as captain of Newcastle Jets once more.

International
In mid-2009, Simon was called up to the Australia under-20 team for the 2009 AFC U-19 Women's Championship. She made her debut for the side in a pre-tournament friendly against South Korea in July 2009.

Simon was first called up to the Australian senior side for the 2014 Cyprus Cup. She made her debut for the team in March 2014, playing a full match in a loss to Scotland in the Group Stage of the tournament. She was again included in the Australia squad for the 2015 Cyprus Cup.

Honours

International
Australia
 Tournament of Nations: 2017

Individual
 Newcastle Jets Player of the Year: 2009–10, 2013–14

See also
List of association football families

References

External links

1990 births
Living people
Australian women's soccer players
Indigenous Australian soccer players
Newcastle Jets FC (A-League Women) players
Melbourne Victory FC (A-League Women) players
Suwon FC Women players
A-League Women players
Women's association football defenders
Women's association football midfielders
2019 FIFA Women's World Cup players
Australia women's international soccer players
People from Armidale
Sportswomen from New South Wales
Soccer players from New South Wales
Avaldsnes IL players
Toppserien players
Ottawa Fury (women) players
USL W-League (1995–2015) players
Expatriate women's footballers in Norway
Expatriate women's soccer players in Canada
Australian expatriate sportspeople in Norway
Australian expatriate sportspeople in Canada
Australian expatriate sportspeople in Iceland
Expatriate women's footballers in Iceland